Kermit Brashear  (born March 16, 1944) is an American politician and lawyer from Omaha, Nebraska. He was a member of the unicameral Nebraska Legislature from 1995 to 2007, and he  served as its speaker from 2005 to 2007.  

Personal life
Brashear was born in Crawford, Nebraska. He graduated from Crawford High School in 1962,  University of Nebraska in 1966 and the University of Nebraska–Lincoln College of Law in 1969. He received an honorary doctorate from Concordia University Nebraska (LL.D., h.c.) in 1983.  He is admitted to practice law in Nebraska, Colorado, and Texas. He has been active in the Republican party at the state and national level.  Since 1990, he has been a partner in Brashear LLP, a law firm in Omaha, Nebraska. Two of his sons, Kermit A. Brashear III, known as "Tre," and Kurth A. Brashear, were active members of the firm until 2012 and 2013, respectively.

He used to be a member of the Board of Directors of the Lutheran Church—Missouri Synod. In 2009-10 he attracted attention and controversy for his role in selling KFUO-FM, the LCMS-owned classical music station in St. Louis, Missouri; as a member of the board, he pushed for selling the station, handled all the negotiations, and personally profited from the sale. Brashear was voted off the Board of Directors at the Lutheran Church-Missouri Synod Convention in St. Louis, Missouri on July 25, 2013, in the first round of voting.

State Legislature
He was elected in 1994 to represent the 4th Legislative District in the Nebraska Legislature and reelected in 1998 and 2002.  He served as Chairman of the Judiciary Committee from 1997 to 2005 and served at various times on the Appropriations, Banking, Commerce & Insurance, and Education Committees, as well as on the Committee on Committees. He was also an ex officio member of the rules committee and a nonvoting member of the Intergovernmental Cooperation committee because of his status as Speaker. Because Nebraska voters passed Initiative Measure 415 in 2001 limiting state senators to two terms after 2001, he was unable run for reelection in 2006.  Pete Pirsch replaced him as the 4th District's state senator after the 2006 legislative election.

References
 
 
 
 

1944 births
Living people
University of Nebraska–Lincoln alumni
Republican Party Nebraska state senators
Nebraska lawyers
Nebraska politicians convicted of crimes
People from Crawford, Nebraska
Speakers of the Nebraska Legislature
20th-century American politicians
21st-century American politicians
20th-century American lawyers
21st-century American lawyers